Superabundance may refer to:

 Superabundance (album), a 2008 album by Young Knives
 Superabundance (algebraic geometry), an inequality in the Riemann–Roch theorem for surfaces
 Myth of superabundance, the belief that Earth has ample resources to satisfy humanity's needs